The canton of Machecoul-Saint-Même (before 2021: Machecoul) is an administrative division of the Loire-Atlantique department, western France. Its borders were modified at the French canton reorganisation which came into effect in March 2015. Its seat is in Machecoul-Saint-Même.

It consists of the following communes:
 
Chaumes-en-Retz (partly)
Cheix-en-Retz
Machecoul-Saint-Même
La Marne
Paulx
Port-Saint-Père
Rouans
Sainte-Pazanne
Saint-Étienne-de-Mer-Morte
Saint-Hilaire-de-Chaléons
Saint-Mars-de-Coutais
Villeneuve-en-Retz
Vue

References

Cantons of Loire-Atlantique